Lützschena-Stahmeln is an area in the north-west of the city of Leipzig, a few miles upriver on the White Elster in what is now known as 'former' East Germany. It is known as the place where the wool merchant Maximilian Speck von Sternburg worked on his model sheep farm and beer brewery, and is still known today for his namesake:  Sternburg.

Schloss Lützschena
The town of Lützschena was once home to an old castle, that was rebuilt several times. It has an adjoining park that is open to the public.

References

External links

Geography of Leipzig
Former municipalities in Saxony